Weight Watchers or WW may refer to:

 Weight Watchers (diet), a comprehensive weight loss program and diet.
 WW International, the company producing the Weight Watchers diet.